The 2009–10 Calgary Flames season was the 30th season for the Calgary Flames, and the 38th for the Flames franchise in the National Hockey League (NHL).  The Flames entered the season with a new head coach as Brent Sutter replaced Mike Keenan. The year opened with the 2009 NHL Entry Draft on June 26–27, as the Flames selected defenceman Tim Erixon with their first selection. 2009 also marked the debut of the Flames' new American Hockey League affiliate, the Abbotsford Heat, as the franchise has relocated from the Quad Cities to the British Columbia city.

While the Flames led the Northwest Division early in the season, an extended slump left them in the eighth and final playoff position by the Olympic break. As a result, general manager Darryl Sutter completed several trades in a bid to improve the team's fortunes. Dion Phaneuf was one of seven roster players sent to other teams between January 31 and the March 3 trade deadline.  The 2010 Winter Olympic tournament interrupted the season during February. Jarome Iginla won his second Olympic gold medal with Team Canada, while Miikka Kiprusoff and Niklas Hagman won bronze medals with the Finnish team. Iginla and Daymond Langkow each played their 1,000th games in February.

The Flames continued to struggle after the Olympic break; they finished the season in tenth place in the West and missed the playoffs for the first time since 2003. The result was disappointing for the organization, and led to media and fan speculation regarding the futures of Sutter and Iginla in Calgary.

Pre-season

The Flames entered the 2009–10 campaign with a new head coach after Brent Sutter was named the 18th coach in franchise history.  His assistants were promoted from within the organization: former Quad City Flames coach Ryan McGill and Calgary Hitmen coach Dave Lowry joined Sutter's staff along with former player Jamie McLennan, who became the team's new goaltender coach.  Sutter had spent the previous two seasons as the coach of the New Jersey Devils, but resigned the position over a desire to return closer to his home in Red Deer, Alberta. He joined his brother Darryl, who remained the Flames' general manager.

Preceding the release of the season schedule, rampant speculation that the Flames were in negotiations to host a second outdoor game for the 2010 NHL Winter Classic were confirmed.  The additional game, suggested by the Canadian Broadcasting Corporation, would have taken place at McMahon Stadium,  though negotiations were not successful and the league scheduled only one outdoor game for New Year's Day.

Training camp had been dominated by the comeback attempt of Theoren Fleury at age 41.  Fleury had last played in the NHL in 2003 as a member of the Chicago Blackhawks before his career was halted by drug and alcohol addictions.  Fleury, who had been under NHL suspension over his addictions since he last played, was reinstated by the league prior to the opening of camp and subsequently signed a tryout offer.  He appeared in the Flames' second pre-season game, against the New York Islanders, drawing a loud ovation from the fans.  He scored the only shootout goal to lead the Flames to a 5–4 victory before acknowledging the Saddledome crowd as it chanted "Theo! Theo! Theo!"

Fleury played four exhibition games, scoring four points, before being released by the Flames. General manager Darryl Sutter expressed his pride in Fleury's attempt and commended his effort, but decided he was not one of the top six wingers in camp, which Sutter and Fleury had agreed was a condition of the tryout continuing. On September 28, 2009, Fleury announced his retirement. He thanked the Flames for allowing him to attempt the comeback, and expressed satisfaction at how his career ended.

The game against the Islanders also featured a devastating open-ice hit by Dion Phaneuf on New York's Kyle Okposo that saw the young forward taken off on a stretcher and sent to hospital with a concussion. The hit led Pascal Morency to leave his team's bench to engage Phaneuf as a melee broke out in the aftermath of the check. The league reviewed the incident and suspended Morency ten games for leaving the bench.

Regular season

The Flames were expected to battle the Vancouver Canucks for top spot in the Northwest Division.  The two teams met to open the season, a 5–3 victory for Calgary.  It was the first time Calgary won a season opening  game in seven years, and only the second since 1993. The Flames won their next three, including two against their arch-rivals, the Edmonton Oilers to open the season at 4–0 for the first time since 1993–94.  Following a loss to the Dallas Stars, the Flames faced the Chicago Blackhawks, and after scoring five goals in just five minutes, 29 seconds in the first period, went on to give up six consecutive goals to lose the game 6–5 in overtime.  The six-goal outburst by Chicago tied an NHL record for the largest comeback in league history.  Despite a 4–1–1 start to the season, the loss prompted coach Sutter to question the players' mental toughness.  Although they felt they were not playing up to their expectations, the Flames tied a franchise record for the best start to the season, going 7–2–1 after ten games.

The Flames were embroiled in a national controversy in early November after it was revealed the team had secured a private clinic from Alberta Health Services (AHS) to have all players and their families inoculated against the H1N1 flu pandemic at the same time as many Albertans were growing increasingly frustrated with how the province was running public clinics.  The controversy polarized the public and the media, even within individual newspapers.  The Calgary Sun's Michael Platt accused the "millionaire hockey players" of taking vaccinations from "shivering children", while Eric Francis defended the club by pointing to the millions of dollars and hundreds of hours of volunteer time the team gives to the medical community. The Flames defended their actions, stating they completed an agreement with AHS prior to the Alberta government's controversial clinics opening and arguing that they did so at a time when the government was encouraging all Albertans to get the vaccinations. AHS responded to the controversy by firing two people, including the most senior staff member involved in permitting the private clinic to go ahead.

Coincidentally, goaltender Miikka Kiprusoff was sidelined by what was suspected to be the flu on the same night the controversy broke. Backup Curtis McElhinney was a surprise starter against the Dallas Stars, and responded with a 38 save performance in a 3–2 overtime victory.  The victory ended a two-game losing streak that again led Sutter to criticize the efforts of his team, especially captain Jarome Iginla, and prompted the coach to put the players through an intense practice session prior to the game in Dallas. Kiprusoff surrendered only two goals in the Flames next three games as Calgary opened November with four consecutive wins, including a 1–0 shutout in Montreal against the Canadiens that was his 200th win as a Flame.

In spite of losing Curtis Glencross to a three-game suspension in early November, and suffering an embarrassing 7–1 loss at home to the Blackhawks in which leading scorer Rene Bourque suffered an undisclosed injury, the Flames continued their torrid pace through November. Calgary moved past the Colorado Avalanche, into the division lead late in the month following a 3–0 shutout victory over the Detroit Red Wings.  Victories over the Columbus Blue Jackets and Nashville Predators saw the Flames finish the month of November with a 10–2–2 record and tie a franchise record for points in consecutive road games at ten.  Jarome Iginla led the Flames offensively in the month, recording 13 goals and 20 points in 12 games and was named the first star of the month of November.

The Flames struggled in December, losing six of seven games during one stretch in the middle of the month that was punctuated with a 5–1 loss on home ice to the Canucks that the players described as embarrassing and which briefly dropped the Flames to eighth place in the Western Conference.  The loss to Vancouver also began the busiest part of the schedule for the Flames, who ended 2009 in the middle of a five game in seven night stretch and nine games in two weeks.  The Flames entered the new year on a three-game winning streak that included two more victories over the Oilers, and were looking forward to putting their disappointing month of December behind them.

Rosters for the 2010 Winter Olympics were announced in December.  Olli Jokinen joined Kiprusoff in being named to the Finnish team, while Jarome Iginla was named an alternate captain for Team Canada.  Dion Phaneuf, Jay Bouwmeester and Robyn Regehr, whom all attended the summer Olympic camp, were left off the Canadian roster. Jokinen felt that the teams poor December played a role in their being left off, and expressed that the team felt they let the three defencemen down as a result. At the Olympic tournament, Iginla led the tournament with five goals, and assisted on Sidney Crosby's  overtime winning goal in the gold medal final against the United  States. Kiprusoff, along with Niklas Hagman, who was acquired from Toronto before the Games, both won bronze medals.

Two wins to begin January extended the Flames' winning streak to five games. An extended scoring slump led the team to struggle for the rest of the month, culminating in a nine-game losing streak; the longest the team has endured since an 11-game losing streak in 1985–86.  The Flames finally ended the skid with a 6–1 victory, led by Iginla's four points and Gordie Howe hat trick, over the Oilers, who had their own losing streak extended to 13 games. In doing so, the Flames won all six games against Edmonton, the first time either team has swept the other in the 30-year history of the rivalry. The following day, on January 31, Darryl Sutter completed a seven player trade with the Toronto Maple Leafs that saw Dion Phaneuf sent to Toronto. Olli Jokinen and Brandon Prust were then sent to the New York Rangers for Ales Kotalik and Chris Higgins a day later in a trade that was first rumoured the evening before but was delayed so that Jokinen and Prust could play with the Flames against the Philadelphia Flyers.

Three losses in four games, capped by a 5–0 defeat against the Boston Bruins on March 27 left the Flames six points out of the eighth and final playoff spot with seven games remaining. The team also lost second-line centre Daymond Langkow after he was taken off the ice on a stretcher in Minnesota after being struck in the back of the neck by a slapshot. However, a 5–3 road victory against the Eastern Conference leading Washington Capitals and a 2–1 home win against the Phoenix Coyotes, coupled with the Colorado Avalanche losing six of their final seven games to end the month of March, left the Flames two points behind the Avalanche heading into April.

The Flames struggled on the power play, finishing 30th overall in power-play goals, with 43. They did, however, tie the Detroit Red Wings for the fewest shorthanded goals allowed, with just 1.

Playoffs
Consecutive losses to Chicago and San Jose, coupled with two victories by Colorado eliminated the Flames from playoff contention in the final week of the season.  The Flames failed to qualify for the post season for the first time since 2003.  Flames players lamented their inability to score goals at key times as a primary reason for the team's failure. The dismal result for the Flames led fans and media to question whether the team needed to make significant changes in the off-season. The future of general manager Darryl Sutter with the team was called into question, while many wondered if it was time to part ways with captain Jarome Iginla, who had been with the team since 1996.  For his part, Iginla accepted responsibility for the failed season, and said he did not wish to leave Calgary, wanting instead to lead the Flames into a rebound season in 2010–11.  When pressed by the media, he stated he would be willing to waive his no movement clause if the team asked him to, though Flames management dismissed speculation that they would consider dealing the team's captain.

With the Flames out of the playoffs, several players were invited to represent their national teams at the 2010 IIHF World Championship in Germany.  Rene Bourque and Mark Giordano played for Team Canada, while Eric Nystrom and David Moss joined Team USA.  Mikael Backlund joined the Swedish team after the Abbotsford Heat were eliminated from the American Hockey League playoffs and won a bronze medal.

Player statistics

Skaters
Note: GP = Games played; G = Goals; A = Assists; Pts = Points; +/− = Plus/minus; PIM = Penalty minutes

Goaltenders
Note: GP = Games played; TOI = Time on ice (minutes); W = Wins; L = Losses; OT = Overtime losses; GA = Goals against; GAA= Goals against average; SA= Shots against; SV= Saves; Sv% = Save percentage; SO= Shutouts

†Denotes player spent time with another team before joining Flames. Stats reflect time with the Flames only.
‡Traded mid-season
Bold/italics denotes franchise record

Awards and honours
Brett Hull, selected by the Flames 114th overall at the 1984 NHL Entry Draft, was elected to the Hockey Hall of Fame in 2009.  Hull Scored 741 goals during his 19-year career, the third highest total in NHL history.  During the season, Iginla and Langkow reached significant career milestones on consecutive nights as they played their 1,000th career games in the NHL.  Both players made their debut in the 1995–96 season and were both opponents during their Western Hockey League careers and teammates at the 1996 World Junior Ice Hockey Championships. The Flames presented the pair with silver sticks at a joint ceremony to honour them for their achievement.

Awards

Milestones

Transactions

The Flames completed several trades during the 2009 NHL Entry Draft. They first gained an additional third-round selection from the New Jersey Devils for agreeing to swap first-round picks. The Flames moved down to the 23rd overall pick and gave the Devils the 20th overall selection.  Calgary followed that up by dealing a third-round pick to the Florida Panthers, along with the negotiating rights of Free agent defenceman Jordan Leopold in exchange for the negotiating rights of defenceman Jay Bouwmeester. The move proved successful, as Bouwmeester agreed to a five-year contract less than a day before he would have become an unrestricted free agent.

Having already signed Bouwmeester, the Flames were relatively quiet in the first days of the free agent signing period.  The team signed a quartet of players in Fredrik Sjostrom, Garth Murray, Riley Armstrong and Staffan Kronwall.  They lost team leading scorer Michael Cammalleri after he signed a five-year, $30 million contract with the Montreal Canadiens.  Adrian Aucoin also moved on, signing with the Phoenix Coyotes.  The team was able to retain defenceman Adam Pardy, as he signed a two-year deal to remain in Calgary.

Darryl Sutter engineered a seven player trade at the end of January that sent Dion Phaneuf and Fredrik Sjostrom to the Toronto Maple Leafs in exchange for four players led by Matt Stajan, Ian White and Niklas Hagman. The deal ended weeks of speculation about the Calgary defenceman's future amid reports that Phaneuf had requested a trade – a claim he had denied. One day later, the Flames sent Olli Jokinen and Brandon Prust to the New York Rangers in exchange for Ales Kotalik and Chris Higgins. The deals resulted in the change of over one third of the roster in the period of a day, moves that were seen as a sign of panic as the Flames hovered around the final playoff spot. While rumours circulated that Phaneuf was dealt because he was a divisive influence in the locker room, Jokinen later blamed the fans in Calgary for the defenceman's departure. Jokinen admitted that he was traded because he failed to produce in Calgary, while in Kotalik, the Flames received a player who was having a similarly disappointing season in New York.

The Flames completed three trades at the March 3 deadline. They first sent backup goaltender Curtis McElhinney to the Anaheim Ducks in exchange for Vesa Toskala, who became Kiprusoff's backup. They then sent forward Dustin Boyd to the Nashville Predators in exchange for a draft pick.  Despite showing potential at times, the 23-year-old Boyd had failed to live up to the expectations placed on him in Calgary. The day ended with a minor, but historic, trade that saw Aaron Johnson sent to the Edmonton Oilers along with a draft pick, for fellow defenceman Steve Staios. The deal marked the first time in the 30-year history of the Battle of Alberta that the two organizations completed a trade with each other.

Trades

Additions and subtractions

Draft picks

The Flames opened the 2009 NHL Entry Draft in Montreal with the 20th overall selection but moved down three spots following a trade with New Jersey.  With the 23rd overall pick, Calgary drafted Swedish defenceman Tim Erixon. Erixon, whose father Jan also played in the NHL, considers himself a two-way defenceman, and hopes to contribute both offensively and defensively for the Flames.

Statistics are updated to the end of the 2014–15 NHL season. † denotes player was on an NHL roster in 2014–15.

Farm teams
After two seasons in Illinois, the Flames' relocated their American Hockey League franchise, the Quad City Flames to the Fraser Valley of British Columbia. Called as the Abbotsford Heat, the team named former Calgary head coach Jim Playfair their coach.  After six seasons, the Flames and the Las Vegas Wranglers of the ECHL ended their affiliation agreement. Replacing the Wranglers, the Flames signed an agreement to place up to four players with the Utah Grizzlies.

Playfair gained notoriety late in the season after video of his wild tantrum against referee Jamie Koharski that involved the coach smashing two sticks went viral. Playfair was upset at what he felt was an excessive penalty given to one of his players, and came as the Heat were struggling to clinch a playoff spot.  The Heat finished with a record of 39–29–5–7, good enough for third place in the North Division, despite losing over 400-man-games to injury. The Heat faced the Rochester Americans in the first round of the playoffs, and overcame a 3–1 series deficit to defeat the Americans in seven games.  In doing so, they became the first team in AHL history to win games six and seven on the road to win a series. Abbotsford was defeated in six games by the Hamilton Bulldogs in the North Division final to end their season.

References

 Player stats: 
 Game log: 
 Team standings: 

Calgary Flames season, 2009-10
Calgary Flames seasons
CAl